The National anthem of Manchukuo was one of the many national symbols of independence and sovereignty created to foster a sense of legitimacy for Manchukuo in both an effort to secure international diplomatic recognition and to foster a sense of nationalism among its inhabitants.
 
During Manchukuo's 13-year existence, two national anthems were used.

The National anthem of Manchukuo was widely taught in schools and used in ceremonies in Manchukuo.

1932 proposed version

It is unclear when Manchuria began its first national anthem production, but it seems that preparations had already begun around the Manchuria National Declaration on March 1, 1932. On May 21, 1932, the Manchuria Sports Association formally applied to the Organizing Committee of the Olympics to dispatch players to the Los Angeles Olympics (held in July 1932). The Organizing Committee urges the Manchuria country to apply to the International Olympic Committee as “participation is approved by the International Olympic Committee (IOC)” and informs the Organizing Committee to send the national flag and national anthem, they have done it. On the other hand, there is still a record that the Manchuria Sports Association sent a document stating that “the national flag and national anthem were sent to the organizing committee” to the secretary general of the Olympic organizing committee. Before May, the song was completed.

However, the line "a country good at defense uses humaneness, a country bad at defense uses military force." upset the Kwantung Army, and the lyrics written in Classical Chinese were too difficult to be understood by the ordinary citizens, the drafted anthem was not favored.

1933 version

The first national anthem was declared by State Council Decree No.4, dated 24 February Dàtóng 2 (1933) but publicized on March 1. The lyrics were written by Manchukuo's first Prime Minister Zheng Xiaoxu, who was a devout Confucianist and Qing loyalist in addition to being an accomplished poet and calligrapher.

1942 version

The national anthem was changed on 5 September Kāngdé 9 (1942), by State Council Order No. 201. Prime Minister of Manchukuo Zhang Jinghui cited the 1933 version of the anthem was unsuitable for the current situations of the Empire as the reason for the change. The new anthem, with Manchurian (i.e. Mandarin Chinese) and Japanese lyrics, was written by a committee, according to Zhang. The 1933 anthem was renamed the Manchukuo Independence Song (滿洲國建國歌, pinyin: Mǎnzhōuguó jiàn guógē, Japanese Hepburn romanization: Manshukoku-kenkoku uta).

Lyrics

Official Interpretation
According to the official interpretation of the anthem issued on the same day of its adoption, the "God" in the first line refers to Amaterasu, the sun goddess in Shinto, referring to Manchukuo's adoption of State Shinto as its state religion in 1940. Also, God's Light is interpreted as Arahitogami, i.e. Emperor of Japan. The whole of the first line is interpreted as 

"The Divine Work" in the fourth line came from Kangde's Imperial Rescript on the Tenth Anniversary of the Nation on 1 March 1942, in which he mentioned, 
and hence interpreted as:

References

External links 
旧満洲国国歌の作曲者は山田耕筰か? - There is a 1932 version of the score.
National anthem of Manchukuo with music and lyrics

Manchukuo
Historical national anthems
Politics of Manchukuo